Andy Russell may refer to:

Andy Russell (Canadian author) (1915–2005), conservationist
Andy Russell (singer) (1919–1992), American popular vocalist
Andy Russell (American football) (born 1941), American football linebacker
Andy Russell (Trigger Media) (born 1971), American business executive
Andy Russell (footballer, born 1987), English-born Hong Kong football defender

See also
Andrew Russell (disambiguation)